Cryptic protein, also cryptic family member 1 is a protein that in humans is encoded by the CFC1 gene.

Function

This gene encodes a member of the epidermal growth factor (EGF)- Cripto, Frl-1, and Cryptic (CFC) family, which are involved in signalling during embryonic development. Proteins in this family share a variant EGF-like motif, a conserved cysteine-rich domain, and a C-terminal hydrophobic region. The protein encoded by this gene is necessary for patterning the left-right embryonic axis. Mutations in this gene are associated with defects in organ development, including autosomal visceral heterotaxy and congenital heart disease. Alternatively spliced transcript variants encoding multiple isoforms have been observed for this gene.

References

Further reading 

Human proteins